The eleventh season of Akademi Fantasia, also branded as AF2014, premiered on 1 September 2014 and concluded on 9 November 2014 on the Astro Ria television channel. Ramli M.S. and Raja Azura joined the judging panel.

On 7 September 2014, during the opening of first concert, Hattan was revealed to be Principal for this season. Zizan Razak returned as a host and at the end of first concert, Faizal Ismail was announced as a co-host., while Jihan Musa was announced as host for Diari Akademi Fantasia.

On 9 November 2014, Mhd Firman Bansir was announced as the season's winner, making the second winner from Tawau, Sabah, defeating  Mohd Razman Abd Aziz.

Auditions
Auditions were held in the following cities:
 KSL Resorts & Hotel, Johor Bahru - 13 & 14 June 2014
 Sunway Hotel, Seberang Jaya, Penang - 14 & 15 June 2014
 Novotel Hotel, Kota Kinabalu, Sabah - 21 & 22 June 2014
 Kuala Lumpur - 21 & 22 June 2014

List of songs during auditions

Songs for female
 "Bosan" – Stacy
 "Teringin" - Shima
 "Patah Seribu" - Shila Amzah
 "Lebih Indah" - Datuk Siti Nurhaliza
 "Angin Syurga" - Misha Omar

Songs for male
 "Penglipurlara" – Hazama
 "Bahagiamu Deritaku" – Hafiz
 "Tetap Menantimu" – Nomad
 "Romancinta" – Mojo
 "Tinggal Kenangan" – Saleem

Contestants were required to be between the ages of 18 to 35, and are Malaysian and Singaporean citizens. As a part of conditions made by the principal, Datuk Hattan was there will be no song made from Indonesia allowed to be performed by this year contestants. He said "There are many more local song that can be performed and we should be proud of it".

Students
ages stated are at time of contest)

Concert summaries

Week 1
 Original airdate: 7 September 2014
 Theme: Student's Choice
 Guest judge: Tam (Spider)
 
 Eliminated: No elimination.

Week 2
 Original airdate: 14 September 2014
 Theme: 90s 
 Guest judge: Amy Mastura
 
 Eliminated: Walfadhilah binti Suhaizat (Wawa)

Week 3
 Original airdate: 21 September 2014 
 Theme: Hitz Fantasia
 Guest judge: Dato' Aznil Haji Nawawi
 
 Eliminated: Muhammad Fareezuan bin Adnan (Farez)

Week 4
 Original airdate: 28 September 2014
 Theme: Tribute to Malaysian Composer
 Guest judge: Ziana Zain
 
 Eliminated: Muna Shahirah binti Munadi (Muna)

Week 5
 Original airdate: 5 October 2014 
 Theme: Praise & Worship
 Guest judge: Nash (Lefthanded)
 
 Eliminated: No elimination.

Week 6
 Original airdate: 12 October 2014 
 Theme: Rock
 Guest judge: Awie & Edrie Hashim

 Eliminated: Nor Aziha binti Mohammad Salleh (Ziha)

Week 7
 Original airdate: 19 September 2014
 Theme: Remy & Sally (Tribute to Tan Sri P. Ramlee & Puan Sri Saloma)
 Guest judge: Erra Fazira
 
 Eliminated: Adeline Joyce Masidah (Adel)

Week 8
 Original airdate: 26 October 2014
 Theme: Media's Choice
 Guest judge: Roslen Fadzil
Solo 
 
 
Duet/group 
 
 Eliminated: Nina Nadira binti Naharuddin (Nina) & Muhammad Zharif bin Mohammad Kamil (Zarif)

Week 9 (semi-finals)
 Original airdate: 2 November 2014
 Theme: Student's Choice
 Guest judge: Fauziah Latiff
Solo
 

Duet
 
 Eliminated: Azwan bin Satar (Azwan) 
 AF SERAP: Adeline Joyce Masidah (Adel) 
Adel was chosen by the faculty to be re-entered into the competition and will compete in the final week.

Week 10 (Final)
 Original airdate: 9 November 2014
 Theme: Grand Finale
 Guest judge: Amy Search

 Champion: Mohammad Firman bin Bansir (Firman) 
 Runner-up: Mohammad Razman bin Abdul Aziz (Aman) 
 Third place: Ikhwal Hafiz bin Ismail (Ewal) 
 Fourth place: Syamila Nuhair binti Zainordi (Nuha) 
 Fifth place: Adeline Joyce Masidah (Adel)

Elimination chart

Elimination order

 The student was re-entered into the competition through "AFSERAP" (Faculty's choice).
  There was no elimination on the first and fifth week .
  There was a double elimination on the eight week .
  Adel was chosen by the faculty(among all the eliminated students)to be re-entered into the competition through AFSERAP and it was announced at the end of the ninth concert by the principal.

Cast members

Hosts
 Zizan Razak - Host of concert Akademi Fantasia
 Faizal Ismail - Host of concert Akademi Fantasia
 Jihan Muse - Host of Diari Akademi Fantasia

Professional trainers
 Hattan - Principal
 Siti Hajar Ismail - Vocal Presentation
 Linda Jasmine - Choreographer
 Fatimah Abu Bakar - English Language Consultant & Counsellor
 Marlia Musa - Drama & Acting
 Acis - Music Director

Judges
 Ramli M.S.
 Raja Azura

Juri Juara
 Stacy
 Hafiz

Season statistics
 Total number of students: 12
 Oldest student: Azwan Satar, 30 years old
 Youngest students: Walfadhilah Suhaizat & Muhammad Fareezuan Adnan, 19 years old
 Tallest student: Muhammad Fareezuan Adnan
 Shortest student: Nor Aziha Md Salleh
 Student with the most consecutive highest votes: Azwan Satar, 6 times
 Student with the most collective highest votes: Azwan Satar, 6 times
 Student with the most bottom three appearances: Nor Aziha Md Salleh, 4 times
 Students with no bottom three appearances: Mhd Firman Bansir

References

External links
 Official Site
 

2014 Malaysian television seasons
Akademi Fantasia seasons